Coordination of Democratic Rights Organisations (CDRO) is a union of twenty civil liberties and democratic rights associations in India. Its member organisations meet a minimum of three to four times annually, and all of them holds equal status within the CDRO, and work in the democratic manner. It was founded in August 2007 "in the context of the violent state repression of people's movements in India as well as the arrest of democratic rights activists."

Beliefs and objectives
 "The right to organize and struggle is a basic democratic right of the people."
 "To stand united against all forms of state repression on people’s democratic struggles."
 "To support with solidarity actions in the event of attacks by the state on any civil rights organisations or its representatives."

Members
It has twenty members, as follows:

See also
 Citizen's Justice Committee
 Confederation of Human Rights Organizations

References

External links
 facebook page
 JKCCS Resolution on Kashmir - adopted on 20 April 2013 in a public meeting at Srinagar and Endorsed by CDRO and others, People's Union for Democratic Rights

2007 establishments in India
Civil liberties advocacy groups
Civil rights organizations
Human rights organisations based in India
Political organisations based in India
Organizations established in 2007